Washington Maritime National Wildlife Refuge Complex is an administrative grouping of six National Wildlife Refuges in Washington, managed by the United States Fish and Wildlife Service. It includes:

 Flattery Rocks National Wildlife Refuge
 Quillayute Needles National Wildlife Refuge
 Copalis National Wildlife Refuge
 Dungeness National Wildlife Refuge
 Protection Island National Wildlife Refuge
 San Juan Islands National Wildlife Refuge

Washington Islands Wilderness refuges 
Flattery Rocks, Quillayute Needles, and Copalis are a group of 870 islands, rocks, and reefs extending for more than 100 miles along Washington's coast from Cape Flattery to Copalis Beach. These islands are protected from human disturbance, yet are close to abundant ocean food sources. They make up the Washington Islands Wilderness and are closed to the public, with wildlife observation only from boats and the mainland, and a 200-yard buffer zone surrounds each island. Only Tatoosh Island, James Island, and Destruction Island are not included in the wilderness area, which was established in 1970.

More than a million seabirds, waterfowl, and shorebirds may live on the islands during migration season. Breeding colonies of 14 species of seabirds use these rocks to raise their young. Mammals that live near the islands include sea lions, harbor seals, sea otters, and whales.[3]

These three lie within the boundary of Olympic Coast National Marine Sanctuary (National Oceanic and Atmospheric Administration). Along with nearby Olympic National Park the three agencies cooperate on research programs and other issues that may have impacts on the resources.

The refuges were originally created as Flattery Rocks Reservation, Quillayute Needles Reservation, and Copalis Rock Reservation on October 23, 1907, by executive orders from Theodore Roosevelt. They were renamed by a presidential proclamation on July 25, 1940. Flattery Rocks encompasses the islands off the Washington coast between latitudes 48° 02′ North and 48° 23′ North, Quillayute Needles those between latitudes 47° 38′ North, and 48° 02′ North, and Copalis those between latitudes 47° 08′ North, and 47° 29′ North. James Island was removed from Quillayute Needles in 1966 and returned to the Quileute when the island was discovered to be part of the Quileute Indian Reservation.

References

External links 

Washington Maritime National Wildlife Refuge Complex
Flattery Rocks National Wildlife Refuge U.S. Fish and Wildlife Service
 Quillayute Needles National Wildlife Refuge U.S. Fish and Wildlife Service
 Copalis National Wildlife Refuge U.S. Fish and Wildlife Service
Washington Islands Wilderness

National Wildlife Refuges in Washington (state)
Protected areas of Clallam County, Washington
Protected areas of Jefferson County, Washington
Protected areas of Grays Harbor County, Washington
Protected areas established in 1907
1907 establishments in Washington (state)